The Nottingham Weather Centre (also referred to Nottingham Watnall) is a functioning observation and weather station located in Watnall, Nottinghamshire in England.

The weather station was established in 1941 and like many other weather stations in the United Kingdom, the recording of weather observations began in January 1960. The weather centre is currently being managed by the Met Office. The station's WMO classification index is 03354.

Climate

During the period of 1981–2010, the Nottingham Weather Centre lies within hardiness zone 9a and lies within the AHS heat zone 1. For the periods of 1961–1990 and 1971–2000 the station lied within the hardiness zone 8b, as the average annual minimum temperature was below  during those periods.

References

Meteorological stations
Buildings and structures in Nottinghamshire
Science and technology in Nottinghamshire
Met Office